Astrid Carlson (1954 – 10 February 2011) was a Norwegian orienteering competitor who competed in the 1970s. She participated at the 1978 World Orienteering Championships in Kongsberg, where she placed 8th in the individual course. She won a silver medal in the relay at the 1979 World Orienteering Championships in Tampere, together with Anne Berit Eid and Brit Volden.

National championships
Carlson became Norwegian champion (relay event) in 1975, 1977 and 1978 with her club Røyken og Spikkestad, and won an individual bronze medal in 1975.

Personal life 
Carlson resided in Buskerud and was a teacher by profession.

She was awarded the Brage Prize in 1995 for the textbook Humanbiologi.
She died in February 2011.

References

1954 births
2011 deaths
People from Buskerud
Norwegian orienteers
Female orienteers
Foot orienteers
World Orienteering Championships medalists
Norwegian textbook writers
Women textbook writers
Norwegian women non-fiction writers
20th-century Norwegian women